The women's snowboard cross competition of the 2013 Winter Universiade was held at Monte Bondone, Italy between December 11–12, 2013.

The qualification round was completed on December 11, while the elimination round was completed on December 12.

Medalists

Results

Qualification

Elimination round

Quarterfinals
The top 24 qualifiers advanced to the Quarterfinals. From here, they participated in six-person elimination races, with the top three from each race advancing. 

Heat 1

Heat 2

Heat 3

Heat 4

Semifinals

Heat 1

Heat 2

Finals

Small Finals

Big Finals

External links
Official results at the universiadetrentino.org.

Snowboarding at the 2013 Winter Universiade